Dickinson Public Schools is a system of public schools located in Dickinson, North Dakota.

Schools

Elementary schools
Berg Elementary School
Heart River Elementary School
Jefferson Elementary School
Lincoln Elementary School
Roosevelt Elementary School

Junior high school
Hagen Junior High School

High schools
Dickinson High School
Southwest Community High School (alternative high school)

References

External links

School districts in North Dakota
Education in Stark County, North Dakota
Dickinson, North Dakota